In mathematical analysis, the universal chord theorem states that if a function f is continuous on [a,b] and satisfies , then for every natural number , there exists some  such that .

History
The theorem was published by Paul Lévy in 1934 as a generalization of Rolle's Theorem.

Statement of the theorem
Let  denote the chord set of the function f.
for all natural numbers n.

Case of n = 2
The case when n = 2 can be considered an application of the Borsuk–Ulam theorem to the real line. It says that if  is continuous on some
interval  with the condition that , then there exists some  such that . 

Proof of n = 2
Being the sum of two continuous functions,  is continuous, . It follows that  and by applying the intermediate value theorem, there exists  such that , so that . Which concludes the proof of the theorem for

Proof of general case
The proof of the theorem in the general case is very similar to the proof for 
Being the sum of two continuous functions,  is continuous. Furthermore, . It follows that there exists integers  such that  
The intermediate value theorems gives us c such that  and the theorem follows.

See also
Intermediate value theorem
Borsuk–Ulam theorem
Rolle's theorem

References

Mathematical theorems